Serer may refer to:
 Serer people
 Serer language
 Serer religion
Rafael Calvo Serer (1916-1988), Spanish historian

Language and nationality disambiguation pages